Coronals are consonants articulated with the flexible front part of the tongue. Among places of articulation, only the coronal consonants can be divided into as many articulation types: apical (using the tip of the tongue), laminal (using the blade of the tongue), domed (with the tongue bunched up), or subapical (using the underside of the tongue) as well as different postalveolar articulations (some of which also involve the back of the tongue as an articulator): palato-alveolar, alveolo-palatal and retroflex. Only the front of the tongue (coronal) has such dexterity among the major places of articulation, allowing such variety of distinctions. Coronals have another dimension, grooved, to make sibilants in combination with the orientations above.

Places of articulation
Coronal places of articulation include the dental consonants at the upper teeth, the alveolar consonants at the upper gum (the alveolar ridge), the various postalveolar consonants (including domed palato-alveolar, laminal alveolo-palatal, and apical retroflex) just behind that, the subapical retroflex consonants curled back against the hard palate, and linguolabial consonants with the tongue against the upper lip.  Alveolo-palatal and linguolabial consonants sometimes behave as dorsal and labial consonants, respectively, rather than as coronals.

Examples
In Arabic and Maltese philology, the sun letters represent coronal consonants.

European

Australian Aboriginal
In Australian Aboriginal languages, coronals contrast with peripheral consonants.

See also
 Peripheral consonants, the set of non-coronal consonants
 Apical consonant
 Laminal consonant
 Subapical consonant
 Place of articulation
 List of phonetics topics

References

Further reading